Jim Bruce Viray is a Filipino former professional basketball player.

Draft
He was signed by the Barako Bull Energy Boosters in 2009 as a free agent.

External links
PBA Online! Profile

1985 births
Living people
Barako Bull Energy Boosters players
Filipino men's basketball players
San Sebastian Stags basketball players
Shooting guards
Small forwards